is a Japanese artistic gymnast. Born in Mie, Japan, he graduated from National Institute of Fitness and Sports in Kanoya and later join Tokushukai Gymnastics Club. Sugino has represented Japan at several FIG World Cup competitions.

See also 
 Japan men's national gymnastics team

References

External links 
 Takaaki Sugino at FIG website

Japanese male artistic gymnasts
Sportspeople from Mie Prefecture
Living people
1998 births
21st-century Japanese people